Bussum is a commuter town and former municipality in the Gooi region in the south east of the province of North Holland in the Netherlands near Hilversum. Since 2016, Bussum has been part of the new municipality of Gooise Meren. 

History
For a long time Bussum was not more than a hamlet situated amongst the heathlands of the Gooi and was first mentioned in 1306. In this time, Bussum was a large heathland with many small farms, sheep pens and forests as is shown on old maps. Since Bussum is situated near the fortified town Naarden it was governed by Naarden from 1369 onward. In 1470 Bussum was inhabited by about 250 people, which made it the smallest village in the Gooi. 

Bussum became independent from Naarden in 1817, yet it was not until the arrival of a railway line in 1874 that Bussum began to flourish. Two train stations were built in the town, that still exist today: Naarden-Bussum and Bussum Zuid (Dutch for Bussum South), both on the connection between Amsterdam and Hilversum. The stations and the road network fostered the town's status as a satellite town of Amsterdam, allowing for reverse commute also to Hilversum. From 1898 until 1907, Bussum housed the first Dutch socialist colony after the example of Thoreau's Walden, set up by the writer and psychiatrist Frederik van Eeden. In 1951, Bussum hosted the first Dutch national TV broadcast and the national TV studios were located there until 1964. 

Bussum was set to merge with the local municipalities of Naarden, Muiden and Muiderberg on 1 January 2016. In October 2014, the combined town councils chose the name Gooise Meren for the new municipality, the other options being Naarden-Bussum and Naardingerland.

Local government 
The last municipal council of Bussum consisted of 23 seats, which were divided as follows (2015):
 VVD - 5 seats
 Hart voor Bussum - 4 seats
 PvdA - 3 seats
 CDA - 2 seats
 GroenLinks - 2 seats
 D66 - 2 seats
 Gooise Ouderen Partij - 2 seats
 Partij voor Bussum (PVB) - 1 seat
 Fractie Krabbendam - 1 seat
 GooiDuursaam - 1 seat

Notable residents 

 Freddy Wittop (1911–2001) international costume designer
 Karel Thole (1914–2000), painter and illustrator
 Paul Biegel (1925–2006), author
 Willem Duys (1928–2011), radio and television presenter and record producer
 Thierry Veltman (born 1939), artist
 Tineke Lagerberg (born 1941), swimmer
 Ronnie Tober (born 1945), singer and entertainer
 Charles de Lint (born 1951), Canadian author and musician
 Huub Rothengatter (born 1954), racing driver
 Raoul Heertje (born 1963), comedian
 Anneloes Nieuwenhuizen (born 1963), field hockey defender
 Ruud Hesp (born 1965), football goalkeeper
 Ellen Elzerman (born 1971), swimmer
 Thekla Reuten (born 1975), actress
 Wopke Hoekstra (born 1975), Dutch politician
 Joël Drommel (born 1996), football goalkeeper

Transport
The town of Bussum has two railway stations: Naarden-Bussum and Bussum Zuid.

References

External links

 A view on the old town of Bussum

Geography of Gooise Meren
Former municipalities of North Holland
Populated places in North Holland
Municipalities of the Netherlands disestablished in 2016